Marinus Gerritsen (born 9 August 1946 in The Hague) is a Dutch bassist. Best known for being founding member of Dutch group Golden Earring, he is also a producer of artists like Herman Brood. Steve Harris of Iron Maiden counts Gerritsen as an important influence.

References

1946 births
Living people
Dutch rock bass guitarists
Golden Earring members
Musicians from The Hague